A medical alarm is an alarm system designed to signal the presence of a hazard requiring urgent attention and to summon emergency medical personnel.  Other terms for a medical alarm are Personal Emergency Response System (PERS) or medical alert. It is especially important to recognize the need to respond to situations where the person is unable to summon help.

Typical systems have a wireless pendant or transmitter that can be activated in an emergency. When the medical alarm is activated, the signal is transmitted to an alarm monitoring company's central station, other emergency agency or other programmed phone numbers.  Medical personnel are then dispatched to the site where the alarm was activated. Elderly people and disabled people who live alone commonly use/require medical alarms, and some of them have been victimized by fraudulent marketing.

Origin
The concept of home alert systems was conceived and developed in  the 1970s. The American implementation was conceived in 1973 by Andrew Dibner, "a psychologist on leave from Boston University who was studying personality in advanced age." In Germany, in the early 1970s, Wilhelm Hormann thought about developing a comprehensive structure for ambulatory and non-ambulatory care for the sick, the elderly, those who live alone, and people with disabilities.

Dibner established a company in 1974. Named Lifeline Systems Inc., it manufactured all its own equipment, and by 1984 had 225 employees and served "some 42,000 people in 48 states." In 1975 American International Telephone Company offered an emergency home phone system. The user wore a medallion around the neck that when pushed delivered a preprogrammed message to several phone numbers.

Hormann's concept of "home alert" (Hausnotruf) with help from AEG-Telefunken Backnang GmbH was presented to the international public early in 1980.  In 1982 the Hausnotruf PERS system was distinguished with the Frankfurt Innovation Prize of the German Economy by the Wirtschaftsclub Rhein Main e.V. (Rhein-Main Business Club) in Frankfurt-am-Main.

A 2012 Swiss estimate reported that around 50,000 emergency call devices were then use.

Types of providers
There are several different types of medical alarm providers:
 Hospital programs which are operated by volunteers.
 Companies that provide for seniors in their homes.
 Full service companies that provide patient onboarding, logistics management, installation, ongoing education and periodic testing programs.
 Individually coordinated services that rely on a smart phone app to communicate alerts to a list of personal contacts.
 Closed systems which are run by an organization such as a university or CCRC

Types of devices
There are a number of different devices that can be used to trigger an alarm.
 Pendant worn around the neck
 Small device worn on the belt
 Wristband
 Installed motion detectors in a home 
 Radar based detectors in a room
 Smart Protect Smart Watch 
 A smart phone 
Active devices require the user to take some action to trigger an alarm condition; passive systems monitor the user and raise an alarm based on an algorithm - a fall, lack of activity, etc.
A weakness of active devices is that the user must be conscious to trigger the alarm. Both passive and active devices require that the user wear the device. Installed systems can be expensive and difficult to deploy.
 Human brainwaves, or EEG

Functionality

A medical alarm system may consist of
 Personal Device
 a wireless transmitter, which is worn around the neck, on a belt, or on a wrist
 an application running on a smart phone and carried in a pocket
 the device may contain a speaker and microphone
 Sensor(s)
 fall detection sensors
 movement sensors
 door open/close sensors
 usage sensor on a device such as a microwave oven
 Communication
 cellular data access for operation anywhere there is cell phone coverage
 an in-home base station that is either connected to a regular telephone, or to a WiFi network, an ISDN line, or to a cellular data network. The base station may contain a speaker and microphone
 Data
 some systems will transmit the GPS location of the alarming device
 some systems can be configured to transmit additional personal information when an alarm is triggered (such as age, medical history, etc.)
 Responders
 Class-B EMT Operators
 local 911 service
 friend(s) or family

In addition there are various other types of accessories (emergency buttons, fall sensors, smoke detectors, carbon monoxide detectors, flood detectors,  motion detectors) that can be placed around the home and integrated with the base station. Base stations can be connected over analog or digital ISDN connections. In the event of a power failure, these devices can operate on batteries, thus adding an extra degree of safety.

In case of emergency the user can set off a call for help by the press of an alert button on a personal device, without needing to reach the telephone. Systems with passive alerts may set off a call for help if no movement has been detected over some period of time, or if a fall is detected. If a base station shares a phone line, it is able to terminate an in-progress call so that a call for help can be initiated over the telephone.

With some systems, an alert arrives in the offices of the alert system operator (which may be a public rescue service or a private security company) and the data of the affected person (address, medical condition, family contacts) are displayed. With others, there is no system operator, and the user simply programs the numbers of family members, neighbors, or local emergency responders. If present, a responder can speak with the user through the microphone/speaker in order to clarify the type and severity of the emergency and discuss further measures.

Depending on the organization of the service and the type of emergency help required, relatives or neighbors can be informed.  If necessary, health care services or personal physicians can be notified or emergency medical services can be alarmed. Some monitoring services also provide the client with a USB medical alert device so that arriving emergency personnel can have immediate access to vital medical information.

Some units can call user selected numbers, so relatives or neighbors can be called directly, avoiding the expense of a monitoring service.

With some systems, it is common practice for the user to leave a house key with a neighbor or at the system office so that emergency personnel can enter the house even if the resident cannot open the door.  Keys are kept in a safe and marked only with numbers so that improper use is precluded.

In addition to this "active alarm" there is also the option of a "passive alarm" (sometimes called a "safety clock"), on the principle of a so-called dead man's switch. On some device is a button that the user is to activate several times a day; this confirms that the user is well.   If this confirmation goes lacking for a longer period (usually around 12 hours), a telephone call is placed or someone is sent to check whether everything is in order at the residence. Depending on the company offering it, the system may provide for more than emergency use. Some solutions will periodically call to converse with the user.

Monitoring
In the event of an alarm, some systems will place a phone call to a community emergency service such as 911. Others will place a call to the configured number of a friend or family member. Some systems will send an SMS message to configured contacts.

Some systems provide 24x7x365 professional monitoring. The monitoring service for medical alarms (central station) is a call center facility that is staffed by trained professionals.  These professionals are available at all times to receive calls from the medical alarm system.  Monitoring service centers that are approved by Underwriters Laboratories (UL) have internal backup systems to add redundancy.  Some monitoring services employ trained medical operators enabling them to better evaluate the severity of medical requests. In most less developed countries however, response to medical alarms are slow.

Current and future trends
A Florida State University research team is currently working on an Android device to be worn by the user that not only can be used as a typical medical alert monitoring system but has fall detection software built into it.  The system is designed to monitor the user's location, position, and movement in the event a fall occurs. New fall detection technologies are being integrated into watches, pendants, hearing aids, and wall mounted devices that do not need to be worn by an individual.

Fall sensing/fall detection
Detecting a fall can be from more than one point of view, covering both during and after the fall:
 observation, seeing the fall.
 post event, seeing the person prone on the floor or at the bottom of the steps.
 by detection of compensatory behaviour using electroencephalography.
 by a device, detector or sensor on the person, which detects a sudden movement.

Costs
Aside from one time cost for hardware, there are often ongoing fees and sometimes per-activation charges. Some or all of these may be partially funded by reductions on insurance or by an annual prepayment when compared to paying monthly.
 One time outlays: Aside from direct expenditures for sensors, options exist for base-stations and auto-dialers.
 Ongoing fees: These range from zero (self-monitoring) to professional monitoring services.

Fraud
Federal and State charges have been brought against firms for various forms of fraud involving false promises, improper billing and violations of Do Not Call laws. Operationally, those systems that malfunction and for which service is not done on a timely basis can result in other problems: "some localities will fine you if your system cries wolf."

Medical alarms in pop culture
"I've fallen and I can't get up!" was a catchphrase from a 1989 LifeCall Medical Alert System television commercial. In this commercial, an elderly actor is seen fallen and distraught and uses the medical alert system to summon help.  The unintentional humor in the commercial made it a frequent punchline for many comedic acts. Due to the trademark changing hands between competing companies, the trademark currently belongs to LifeCall's direct competitor, Life Alert Emergency Response, and is used in all channels of Life Alert's advertising.

See also
 Medical alert jewelry
 Panic Alarm

References

External links

  Facts for Consumers - Personal Emergency Response Systems U.S. Federal Trade Commission publication

Emergency communication
Medical monitoring equipment